There are various Community High Schools throughout the world, including:

 Iran
Community School, Tehran
 United Kingdom
Cramlington Community High School, Northumberland, England
 United States
Community High School (West Chicago), Illinois
Community High School (Ann Arbor, Michigan)
Community High School (Teaneck, New Jersey)
Community High School (Texas)
Community High School (Tennessee)
Forest Hill Community High School, West Palm Beach, Florida

See also
Community school (disambiguation)
Community High School District 99, Illinois, US